The Chinguetti Mosque is a mosque in Chinguetti, Adrar Region, Mauritania. It was an ancient center of worship created by the founders of the oasis city of Chinguetti in the Adrar region of Mauritania in the thirteenth or fourteenth century. The minaret of this ancient structure is supposed to be the second oldest in continuous use anywhere in the Muslim world.

Architecturally, the structure features a prayer room with four aisles as well as a double-niched symbolic door, or mihrab pointing towards Mecca and an open courtyard. Among its most distinctive characteristics are its spare, unmortared, split stone masonry, its square minaret tower, and its conscious lack of adornment, keeping with the strict Malikite beliefs of the city's founders. The mosque and its minaret is popularly considered the national emblem of the Islamic Republic of Mauritania.

The mosque was restored through a UNESCO effort, but it, along with the city itself, continues to be threatened by intense desertification.

See also
  Lists of mosques 
  List of mosques in Africa
  List of mosques in Egypt

References

External links

Archnet article on the Chinguetti Mosque
2008 World Monuments Watch List of 100 Most Endangered Sites: Chinguetti Mosque
Palin's Travels - Chinguetti

13th-century mosques
Mosques in Mauritania
Adrar Region
13th-century establishments in Africa
Berber architecture